The Sultan Murad Division (Firqat al-Sultan Murad) is an armed rebel group in the Syrian Civil War, created around a Syrian Turkmen identity. It is aligned with the Syrian opposition and are heavily supported by Turkey, who provides funding and military training along with artillery and aerial support. It is the most notable group among Syrian Turkmen Brigades supported by Turkey.

Ideology and structure
The Sultan Murad Division is one of several Syrian rebel groups that support or at least tolerate Turkish nationalist or pan-Turkic ideologies like Neo-Ottomanism and Turanism.

Among the commanders of the group are Ahmed Othman, Fehim İsa and Ali Şeyh Salih, who is an ethnic Arab.

Equipment
Among the Syrian rebel groups participating in the Turkish military intervention in Syria, the Sultan Murad Division is the group that receives the most support from the Turkish Armed Forces. It operates at least 8 FNSS ACV-15 armoured personnel carriers during the operation. The group also operate Milkor MGL grenade launchers.

The main heavy weapons of the group consist of technical vehicles armed with heavy machine guns and autocannons. Previously it has also received BGM-71 TOW anti-tank missiles from the United States, although more support is given by Turkey than the US since the former's intervention.

History
The Sultan Murad Brigade was formed in early 2013 and mainly operated in the Aleppo Governorate. By 2016, the group claimed to have around 1,300 fighters.

In February 2016, it joined the Jaysh Halab rebel coalition led by Ahrar al-Sham. The coalition clashed with Jaysh al-Thuwar (JaT), an FSA group affiliated to the Kurdish-led Syrian Democratic Forces. A high-ranking military JaT commander "Abu Udai Menagh" was reported to have defected to the Sultan Murad Division in August 2016.

It fought against ISIL in the Northern Aleppo offensive (February 2016) and the Northern Aleppo offensive (March–June 2016). In August 2016, it captured al-Rai from ISIL in the Battle of al-Rai (August 2016). In February 2017, it captured al-Bab from ISIL.

Syrian National Army
It took part in the Turkish military intervention in Syria. In mid-2017, it under the command of Fahim Abu Issa and was part of the Hawar Kilis Operations Room, which received ground support from Turkish artillery. It formed the "Sultan Murad Bloc" with other units within the Syrian National Army (SNA). In November 2017, it was reported that Sultan Murad's commander Fehim Issa was appointed as the overall commander of the Hawar Kilis Operation Room, as well as of the Sultan Murad Bloc within it. The Bloc consisted of Turkmen and Arab units including Jabhat Turkmen Souriya.

Between 4 and 15 June 2017, heavy fighting broke out between SNA factions led by the Sultan Murad Division and Ahrar al-Sham and its allies in and near al-Bab. By 15 June, 33 people were killed and 55 injured in the infighting. On 8 June, between 60 and 70 SNA fighters, including several Sultan Murad Division commanders, defected to the Syrian Army and the Syrian Democratic Forces during the clashes. According to the Hawar Kilis Operations Room, the unit led by Abu al-Kheir al-Munbaji that defected to the government had run criminal activities and was supposed to be arrested when it deserted.

In June 2019, it captured Australian ISIL member Mohamed Zuhbi near Afrin, holding him for three months before handing him to Turkey for trial.

In late 2019, it took part in Operation Peace Spring, a Turkish-led offensive against the Kurdish-led Syrian Democratic Forces (SDF).

In early November 2019, according to the Syrian Observatory for Human Rights, the Homs al-Adiyyeh Brigade of the Sultan Murad Division defected to Jaysh al-Izza after the unilateral release of several Syrian Army prisoners of war by the Turkish government in the context of the Second Northern Syria Buffer Zone.

Fighting outside Syria
According to Turkish sources and an activist in Afrin, the Sultan Murad Division was one of the groups which volunteered to send fighters to Libya as part of a Turkish operation to aid the Tripoli-based Government of National Accord in December 2019. There were further reports of Sultan Murad fighters in Libya in early and mid 2020. The Syrian Observatory on Human Rights says these fighters include minors. One Sultan Murad squad leader, Murad Abu Hamoud Al-Azizi, was reported by Egypt Today as killed in Tripoli in fighting that month.

Sultan Murad Division fighters have also been reported to have been deployed by Turkey in Azerbaijan in 2020.

War crimes

Alleged torture of POWs 
After Turkish-backed rebels captured the town of Jarabulus from ISIL in September 2016, Kurdish media reported YPG allegations that Sultan Murad Division fighters were pictured next to four captured YPG fighters and that two Sultan Murad fighters from Hama were captured in retaliation by the SDF-led Jarabulus Military Council and questioned by Kurdish Anti-Terror Units, confessing to torturing the YPG prisoners. The Sultan Murad prisoners reportedly said the YPG prisoners were handed by the Division to Turkey.

Shelling of civilian areas

On 25 October 2013, the Sultan Murad Division shelled a monastery in Aleppo.

According to an Amnesty International report from May 2016, indiscriminate shelling of Sheikh Maqsoud during the Battle of Aleppo (2012–2016) by the Fatah Halab joint operations room, which included the Sultan Murad Division, killed between February and April 2016 at least 83 civilians, including 30 children, and injured more than 700 civilians. Amnesty International's regional director suggested that these repeated indiscriminate attacks constitute war crimes.

A February 2017 report by the United Nations Independent International Commission of Inquiry on the Syrian Arab Republic came to the conclusion that, during the 2016 siege of Eastern Aleppo, Fatah Halab vowed to take revenge on the Kurds in Sheikh Maqsoud and then intentionally attacked civilian inhabited neighbourhoods of the Kurdish enclave, killing and  maiming dozens of civilians, and that these acts constitute the war crime of directing attacks against a civilian population..

Pillage
In September 2020,  the United Nations Office for the High Commissioner for Human Rights (OHCHR) and the Independent International Commission of Inquiry on the Syrian Arab Republic reported on human rights abuses by Syrian National Army fighters in NW Syria. Among these were "Division 24 (the Sultan Murad Brigade), repeatedly perpetrated the war crime of pillage in both the Afrin and Ra’s al-Ayn regions [of Aleppo and Hasakah Governorates]... and may also be responsible for the war crime of destroying or seizing the property of an adversary." In one case, a civilian from Tel al-Arisha village displaced by fighting had to buy back his own looted possessions from a Sultan Murad officer. The commission received reports of forced marriage and abduction of Kurdish women involving members of the Division.

Child soldiers 
In a 2021 Trafficking in Persons (TIP) report by the United States Department of State Turkey was implicated in using child soldiers by providing support to Sultan Murad Division which have been found to be recruiting minors in Syria, and also sending them to Libya to fight.

Kidnap and torture of civilians 

Afrin Post reported that the group kidnapped a civilian, named Khalil Manla, after he filed a complaint against them and detained him to their headquarters. They beat and tortured him before released him on a ransom of 1,000 Turkish liras.

See also

 List of armed groups in the Syrian Civil War
 Syrian Democratic Turkmen Movement

References

Anti-government factions of the Syrian civil war
Anti-ISIL factions in Syria
Free Syrian Army
Syrian Turkmen organizations
Military units and formations established in 2013
Syrian National Army
Turkish supported militant groups of the Syrian civil war